Yermo (Spanish for "wilderness")  is an unincorporated community in the Mojave Desert in San Bernardino County, California. Its population was an estimated 1,750 in 2009.

Founded in 1902 and originally named  Otis, Yermo is situated at a division point of the Union Pacific Railroad line. A post office was established three years later with William J. Flavin serving as Yermo's first postmaster. It later developed around serving motorists traveling the Arrowhead Trail (later U.S. Route 91), which ran through the community.

Today, Yermo is governed by an elected five-member board of directors comprising the Community Services District authorized by the County of San Bernardino. The board, which meets monthly, oversees the community's volunteer fire department, the Yermo/Calico VFD, as well as its street lighting, parks and water system. Yermo's ZIP Code is 92398, and it is in telephone area codes 442 and 760. Its USPS branch provides post office boxes to local residents and businesses; there is no letter-carrier service.

Yermo hosts the  storage and industrial annex of the Marine Corps Logistics Base Barstow.

Economy

Businesses

When Interstate 15 opened in 1968, Yermo was immediately bypassed by traffic traveling to and from Las Vegas, Nevada. As a result, 90 percent of its local businesses were required to close. During its heyday, Yermo had 27 gas stations with mechanics, seven bars, two grocery stores, a hardware store, a pizza shop, four real estate offices, three motels, a thrift store, several restaurants, roadside camping sites and two parks. In 2009, it had one grocery/general store, one bar, one thrift store, three restaurants, four gas stations, one park, and one motel  to the south. The fast-food restaurant chain Del Taco was founded in Yermo in 1964; the original structure remains active as a local fast food restaurant, The Burger Den.

Yermo once had a California agriculture inspection station for traffic heading south on Interstate 15. It relocated in 2018 to just north of Mountain Pass, between Yates Well Road and Nipton Road.

Tourism
At the time, Yermo and Barstow were campaigning to establish a state park at Calico, which was an active silver mining town from the early 1880s until the turn of the 20th century. In 1952, entrepreneur Walter Knott, whose uncle John King was once Calico's sheriff, and who worked at the town as a carpenter in 1915, purchased Calico and restored it. He later deeded it to the San Bernardino County, which operates the site as a historical county park and a popular tourist attraction of the U.S. Southwest.

Other establishments

Schools
The Silver Valley Unified School District (SVUSD) is the education authority in the Yermo area. It operates K-12 schools in the communities of Yermo, Daggett and Newberry Springs, and at the U.S. Army National Training Center at Ft. Irwin.

Churches
In 2009 Yermo had three active churches, one Baptist and two non-denominational/fundamentalist.

Climate
According to the Köppen Climate Classification system, Yermo has a semi-arid climate, abbreviated "BSk" on climate maps with long, very hot summers, sunny winters with cool nights and dry conditions year round.

References

External links
Yermo Community Services District

Populated places in the Mojave Desert
Mining communities in California
Unincorporated communities in San Bernardino County, California
Unincorporated communities in California